Philip P. Betancourt (born 1936 as Felipe Pablo Andreas Betancourt) is an American archaeologist, author, and a specialist in the Aegean Bronze Age. He was the Laura H. Carnell Professor of Art History and Archaeology at Temple University's Tyler School of Art and was an adjunct professor at the University of Pennsylvania in the Graduate Group in the Art and Archaeology of the Mediterranean World and the Department of the History of Art.  He previously served as the Director of the Institute for Aegean Prehistory.  Betancourt received his Ph.D. in Archaeology from the University of Pennsylvania. He was elected a Fellow of the American Academy of Arts and Sciences in 2007.

Personal life
Betancourt's sons are author and publisher John Gregory Betancourt, and artist and critical theorist Michael Betancourt.

Select bibliography
The Origin and Diffusion of Metallic Shaft-hole Implements in the Aegean Early Bronze Age (as Felipe Pablo Betancourt). (1970) University Microfilms International.
The History of Minoan Pottery. (1985) Princeton University Press. 
Chrysokamino I: The Metallurgy Workshop and its Territory. (2006) American School of Classical Studies. 
Introduction to Aegean Art, 2007 
The Bronze Age Begins: The Ceramics Revolution of Early Minoan I and the New Forms of Wealth that Transformed Prehistoric Society. (2008) INSTAP Academic Press.

References

External links
 Faculty Page at the University of Pennsylvania

1936 births
American male writers
Fellows of the American Academy of Arts and Sciences
Living people
Temple University faculty
University of Pennsylvania School of Arts and Sciences alumni
University of Pennsylvania faculty
American archaeologists